"Them Bones" is a song by American rock band Alice in Chains. It is the opening track and the second single from their second album, Dirt (1992). "Them Bones"  peaked at No. 24 on Billboard's Mainstream Rock chart and at No. 30 on the Alternative Airplay chart. The song was also included on the compilation albums Nothing Safe: Best of the Box (1999), Music Bank (1999), Greatest Hits (2001), The Essential Alice in Chains (2006). A live performance of the song is included on their live album Live (2000).

Structure
The song was written by guitarist Jerry Cantrell. When discussing the use of odd time signatures in a 1998 interview with Guitar World, Cantrell said:
"I really don't know where that comes from; it just comes naturally to me. I could sit down and figure it out, but what's the use? Off-time stuff is just more exciting — it takes people by surprise when you shift gears like that before they even know what the hell hit 'em. It's also effective when you slow something down and then slam 'em into the dash. A lot of Alice stuff is written that way — 'Them Bones' is a great off-time song."

Lyrics
Jerry Cantrell said of the song in a 1993 interview with RIP Magazine:
"We [Alice in Chains] definitely have a very sarcastic sense of humor even toward ourselves. You have to be able to laugh at yourself. The music is a way for us to let some serious things out because we're not really talkative people. It's hard for a lot of people to talk about emotions that are really deep pain and hurt and shit like that. 'Them Bones' is pretty cut and dried. It's a little sarcastic, but it's pretty much about dealing with your mortality and life. Everybody's going to die someday. Instead of being afraid of it, that's the way it is: so enjoy the time you've got. Live as much as you can, have as much fun as possible. Face your fear and live. I had family members die at a fairly early age; so I've always had kind of a phobia about it. Death freaks me out. I think it freaks a lot of people out. It's the end of life, depending on your views. It's a pretty scary thing. 'Them Bones' is trying to put that thought to rest. Use what you have left, and use it well."

In the liner notes of 1999's Music Bank box set collection, Cantrell said of the song:
"I was just thinking about mortality, that one of these days we'll end up a pile of bones. It's a thought for every human being, whether you believe in an after-life or that when we die, that's it. The thought that all the beautiful things and knowledge and experiences you've been through just end when you end scares me, the thought that when you close your eyes for good, it's gone forever."

Reception
"Them Bones" was released as a single in 1992 and peaked at number 24 on the Billboard Mainstream Rock Tracks chart and at number 30 on the Billboard Modern Rock Tracks chart. The UK single was released on March 8, 1993. "Them Bones" reached the top 30 in the UK and Ireland.

It is one of the band's most well known songs. Ned Raggett of AllMusic called the song "a brief, tightly wound explosion of sheer, inescapable riff power, focused and relentless" and added that "having made its point in two and a half minutes it stops — not a note is wasted."

Music video
The music video for "Them Bones" was released in 1992 and was directed by Rocky Schenck, who had previously directed the "We Die Young" music video for the band, and who would later direct the music videos for "What the Hell Have I" and "Grind". The video is available on the home video release Music Bank: The Videos. The video was also featured on an episode of Beavis and Butt-head (the episode Sick in 1993) where Butt-head claims that "this is the coolest video I've ever seen."

The video shows the band playing in a cavern, apparently underground. In front of the band is a puddle, in which can be seen Layne Staley singing or various animals eating or fighting with each other and a child being born, which corresponds with the lyrics "Some say / We're born into the grave."

Cover versions
In 2006, Swedish death metal band Grave covered the song which appears on their seventh album, As Rapture Comes. In 2009, American deathcore band Suicide Silence covered the song which appears as a bonus track on the iTunes special edition of their second album, No Time to Bleed. An EP released in 2010 by the German black metal band Secrets of the Moon also features a cover version. Alex De Rosso did a cover on his 2013 album Lions & Lambs. In 2020, American sludge metal band Thou covered the song as part of the "Dirt Redux" covers compilation for Magnetic Eye Records.

In popular culture
"Them Bones" is featured on the soundtrack of the English version of Street Fighter II: The Animated Movie. It is also featured in the video games Grand Theft Auto: San Andreas, ATV Offroad Fury, Madden NFL 10, Guitar Hero II, and Guitar Hero: Smash Hits. "Them Bones" also appeared in the 2004 surfing documentary Riding Giants. and DLC for Rock Band 4.

Track listing

Personnel
Alice in Chains
Layne Staley – lead vocals
Jerry Cantrell – guitars, backing vocals
Sean Kinney – drums
Mike Starr – bass
Production
Produced and mixed by Dave Jerden

Chart positions

Certifications

References

External links
 by Ned Raggett

Rocky Schenk's original concept and drawings for the music video  (PDF)

1992 singles
Alice in Chains songs
Music videos directed by Rocky Schenck
Songs about death
Songs written by Jerry Cantrell
1992 songs
Columbia Records singles